In algebraic geometry, a quasi-coherent sheaf on an algebraic stack  is a generalization of a quasi-coherent sheaf on a scheme.

Constructible sheaves (e.g., as ℓ-adic sheaves) can also be defined on an algebraic stack and they appear as coefficients of cohomology of a stack.

Definition 
The following definition is 

Let  be a category fibered in groupoids over the category of schemes of finite type over a field with the structure functor p.
 for each object , a quasi-coherent sheaf  on the scheme ,

satisfying the cocycle condition: for each pair ,
 equals .
(cf. equivariant sheaf.)

Examples 
The Hodge bundle on the moduli stack of algebraic curves of fixed genus.

ℓ-adic formalism 

The ℓ-adic formalism (theory of ℓ-adic sheaves) extends to algebraic stacks.

See also 

 Hopf algebroid - encodes the data of quasi-coherent sheaves on a prestack presentable as a groupoid internal to affine schemes (or projective schemes using graded Hopf algebroids)

Notes

References 

 Editorial note: This paper corrects a mistake in Laumon and Moret-Bailly's Champs algébriques.

External links 
https://mathoverflow.net/questions/69035/the-category-of-l-adic-sheaves
http://math.stanford.edu/~conrad/Weil2seminar/Notes/L16.pdf Adic Formalism, Part 2 Brian Lawrence March 1, 2017

Sheaf theory
Algebraic geometry